Laurence Brady (20 January 1892 – 14 April 1973) was an Irish politician. He was first elected to Dáil Éireann as a Sinn Féin Teachta Dála (TD) for the Leix–Offaly constituency at the 1923 general election. He did not take his seat in the Dáil due to Sinn Féin's abstentionist policy. He did not contest the June 1927 general election. He stood as a Fianna Fáil candidate at the 1933, 1937 and 1943 general elections but was not elected.

References

1892 births
1973 deaths
Early Sinn Féin TDs
Fianna Fáil politicians
Members of the 4th Dáil